{{Album ratings
| rev1 = Allmusic
| rev1Score = <ref>{{cite web |first=Stephen Thomas |last=Erlewine |title=Chuck Berry - The Anthology |url=https://www.allmusic.com/album/the-anthology-mw0000068083 |publisher=AllMusic}}</ref>
| rev2 = Robert Christgau
| rev2Score = A−
| rev3 = Rolling Stone| rev3Score = 
}}Anthology is a two-disc compilation album by American rock and roll musician Chuck Berry released on July 27, 2000, by Chess Records. It duplicates in its entirety the previous anthology The Great Twenty-Eight ranked at No. 21 on the Rolling Stone 500 greatest all time albums list, as well as the entirety of the later Definitive Collection issued in 2006 as part of the Universal series. The album was later reissued and packaged in 2005 as part of the Universal Records Gold series, and simply retitled Gold. It charted at No. 110 in the UK Albums Chart.

Content
An overview of Berry's Chess recordings, it contains every 45 rpm single released by Berry on the Chess label from his debut in 1955 through March 1965 with the exceptions of the holiday record "Merry Christmas, Baby," "Anthony Boy," "Chuck's Beat" with Bo Diddley, and "Little Marie." This does not include content from every released EP single, but of the 28 A-sides from this time period, 14 were top ten hits on the Billboard R&B singles chart and ten were Top 40 hits on the Billboard Hot 100.

It also includes an additional three singles, "Tulane" from 1970, "Bio" from 1973, and his only No. 1 hit on the Billboard Hot 100, "My Ding-a-Ling" from 1972. After the 31 A-sides, the set's 50 songs total includes eleven b-sides, seven album tracks, and one that appeared on the 1990 rarities compilation, Missing Berries. Four of the b-sides charted independently from their plug side.

Robert Christgau states that although Anthology is less expensive than The Chess Box, it removed several good songs like "Have Mercy Judge" and "Anthony Boy". David McGee, Milo Miles, and Mark Kemp, of Rolling Stone magazine, are of the opinion that Anthology'' is one of the best of Berry's compilation albums.

Track listing
All tracks written by Chuck Berry, except where noted.

Personnel
 Chuck Berry – vocals, guitars
 Matt "Guitar" Murphy, Jimmy Rogers, Hubert Sumlin – electric guitars
 Johnnie Johnson, Lafayette Leake, Otis Spann, Paul Williams —piano
 Willie Dixon – bass
 Reggie Boyd, George Smith – bass
 Fred Below, Ebby Hardy, Odie Payne, Jasper Thomas – drums
 Jerome Green – maracas
 L.C. Davis, James Robinson – saxophone
 Martha Berry, Etta James, The Ecuadors, The Marquees – backing vocals
Owen McIntyre – guitar on "My Ding-a-Ling" and "Reelin' and Rockin'" (live)
Dave Kafinetti – piano on "My Ding-a-Ling" and "Reelin' and Rockin'" (live)
Nic Potter – bass on "My Ding-a-Ling" and "Reelin' and Rockin'" (live)
Robbie McIntosh – drums on "My Ding-a-Ling" and "Reelin' and Rockin'" (live)
Stan Bronstein – saxophone on "Bio"
Adam Ippolito – piano on "Bio"
Wayne "Tex" Gabriel – guitar on "Bio"
Gary Van Scyoc – bass on "Bio"
Rick Frank – drums on "Bio"

Technical personnel
Leonard Chess, Phil Chess, Esmond Edwards – original recording producers
 Andy McKaie – compilation producer
 Erick Labson – digital remastering
 Vartan – art direction
 Mike Fink – design

Charts

References

Gold series albums
Chuck Berry compilation albums
2000 greatest hits albums
Albums produced by Leonard Chess
Albums produced by Phil Chess
Albums produced by Esmond Edwards
Chess Records compilation albums
MCA Records compilation albums
Geffen Records compilation albums